The Department of Environment and Forests of the State of Uttarakhand is one of the departments of Government of Uttarakhand.

References

Government of Uttarakhand
State forest departments of India
2000 establishments in Uttarakhand